Killabakh is a small village located on the Mid North Coast of New South Wales, and  north east of the state capital, Sydney.

At the 2016 census, Killabakh had a population of 274.

Nature Reserves 
 Goonook Nature Reserve  was created in January 1999, and it covers an area of 
 Killabakh Nature Reserve  was created in January 1999. It covers an area of 
 Coxcomb Nature Reserve  was created in March 1999. It covers an area of 
 Alfred Road Reserve. It covers an area of

Annual events
Killabakh a 'Day in the Country'

Emergency services
 RFS

References 

Suburbs of Mid-Coast Council
Mid North Coast
Towns in New South Wales